Francis Louis "Jug" Earp (July 22, 1897 – January 8, 1969) was a professional American football player. He attended Monmouth College in Monmouth, Illinois with the class of 1921. He played 11 seasons in the National Football League (NFL), mostly with the Green Bay Packers and was inducted into the Green Bay Packers Hall of Fame in 1970. He also played with the Rock Island Independents, three games for the New York Yankees, and one game for the Frankford Yellow Jackets.

He is the cousin of Wyatt Earp; his father and Nicholas Porter Earp were brothers.

References

1897 births
1969 deaths
American football centers
Frankford Yellow Jackets players
Green Bay Packers players
Monmouth College alumni
Monmouth Fighting Scots football players
New York Yankees (NFL) players
Rock Island Independents players
People from Monmouth, Illinois
Players of American football from Illinois